Team Pacman was a professional wrestling tag team, that was active in the Total Nonstop Action Wrestling (TNA) promotion from August to October 2007. The team, consisting of National Football League player Adam Jones and Ron Killings, held the promotion's World Tag Team Championship once, but when Jones's football team refused him permission to perform in the ring, Rasheed Lucius Creed was added as a third man for the team's title defense.

History

On August 6, 2007, Total Nonstop Action Wrestling (TNA) confirmed through their website that they had signed a deal with Tennessee Titans cornerback Adam "Pacman" Jones. In interviews with TNA Vice President Jeff Jarrett, Jones indicated that he intended to wrestle, primarily as part of a tag team. In response the Tennessee Titans organization were granted a restraining order barring him from working with the company at all, prompting the two companies to negotiate a compromise stating that Jones wouldn't be allowed to "touch or be touched, use or be hit by any object or anything else that could injure him", but he would be allowed to appear with the company in a non-physical role.

Jones made his first appearance at Hard Justice later that month, taking part in an interview with Mike Tenay explaining that he chose professional wrestling to prove that he could be "the ultimate team player", and TNA specifically because both he and it were "trend setters". They were interrupted, however, by Ron Killings who proceeded to run down and "threaten" Jones until Jones challenged him to enter the ring and fight, only to be kept separated by (kayfabe) security guards. In later backstage segments Jones was shown laid out and bleeding, then being taken away in an ambulance. At the next weeks Impact!, Jones challenged Killings, only to have him appear and profess respect for him—even suggesting forming a team to vie for the World Tag Team Championship. Accepting, the newly minted "Team Pacman" spent the lead up to No Surrender attacking wrestlers and spray painting "autographs" reading "PAC" on their backs. At the show, Team Pacman took the TNA World Tag Team Championship from the champions, Kurt Angle and Sting, with Jones making the actual pin, though he was not otherwise physically involved in the match—refusing to tag in at times and literally running away at others.

Going into Bound for Glory—held in his hometown of Atlanta—TNA announced that Jones purchased 1,500 tickets to the show with the intention of donating them to the Fulton County School District. They also heavily promoted his "in-ring" appearance for the first ever two hour episode of Impact! on October 4, both in television commercials and on their website, but his portion of Team Pacman's match against Team 3D (Brother Ray and Brother Devon) consisted of him mostly avoiding physical contact again—leapfrogging an attempted tackle and catching then throwing a football at Brother Ray, ducking a clothesline, and holding a downed opponents legs for a double team maneuver—before the Voodoo Kin Mafia (B.G. and Kip James) interfered and the match ended in a disqualification. At Bound for Glory, with Jones not being allowed to wrestle a full match, Rasheed Lucius "Consequences" Creed was brought in as a substitute for Jones for the title defense (under the "Freebird Rule") against A.J. Styles and Tomko, while Jones stood outside and watched. Jones attempted to interfere during the match by throwing cash at referee Earl Hebner, which inadvertently distracted Hebner long enough to miss a pin for Team Pacman and allow Styles and Tomko to win the match and the title.

Aftermath
After the loss, Jones all but disappeared from TNA television, with his contract expiring and being passed up for renewal on October 15. Jones would return to the promotion six years later, now known as Impact Wrestling, on the November 7, 2013 episode of Impact!, which was held in Cincinnati. Jones and Bengals practice squad member, defensive end DeQuin Evans, were sitting in the front row and got into an altercation with Bad Influence (Christopher Daniels and Kazarian), who pushed both players, leading them to jump the guardrail and bodyslam both wrestlers in the ring.

Killings also left TNA, rejoining WWE under the ring name R-Truth. He has mostly been used as a comedic character, but has won the WWE United States Championship twice and the WWE Tag Team Championship once. He has also teamed and been allied with The Miz, Kofi Kingston, Xavier Woods, Goldust and Carmella.

Creed, however, was given a contract with TNA, which he was presented with at an NWA Anarchy show. He later teamed with Jay Lethal, with whom he won the World Tag Team Championship. He was released in 2010, and signed a developmental deal with WWE, changing his ring name to Xavier Woods. After stints with WWE's developmental territory Florida Championship Wrestling (FCW) and its third brand NXT, Woods was called up to the main roster, where he resumed his partnership with R-Truth. Following the tag team's disbandment in 2014, he recruited Kingston and Big E to form a stable called The New Day. He has attained the most success with the New Day, becoming a multi-time tag team champion alongside his stablemates, as part of the "Freebird Rule".

Championships and accomplishments
Total Nonstop Action Wrestling
TNA World Tag Team Championship (1 time) – Jones and Killings
Wrestling Observer Newsletter
Most Disgusting Promotional Tactic (2007) TNA's signing of Jones and the use of the "make it rain" taunt (in reference to the Las Vegas incident)

See also
3Live Kru

References

External links

Ron Killings at MySpace
Pacman Jones's NFL Player Profile

Rasheed Lucius "Consequences" Creed at MySpace

Impact Wrestling teams and stables